John Blackford Van Meter (September 6, 1842 – April 8, 1930) was an American Methodist minister, educator, and the co-founder of Goucher College. Van Meter also served as the college's first dean and as acting president from 1911 to 1913.

Early life and education 
Van Meter was born on September 6, 1842, in Philadelphia, Pennsylvania, to Thomas Hurley Van Meter and Johnetta Blackford. He was of English and French descent, and his grandmother was a Quaker. He graduated from Male Central High School in Baltimore, which later became Baltimore City College. Van Meter did not pursue a college degree, which he said was due to his lack of financial means.

Career

Methodist ministry and Navy 
After graduating high school, Van Meter worked as a teacher and later as a principal for several local schools. After briefly contemplating studying law, he instead pursued a career in the Methodist ministry. In the 1860s, he was a minister and preacher at several churches in Maryland and Pennsylvania. In December 1866, Van Meter married Lucinda Cassell of Westminster, Maryland. In December 1871, Van Meter was commissioned into the United States Navy as a chaplain and confirmed by the Senate in January 1872. He resigned from the Navy in April 1882.

Founding of the Women's College of Baltimore City 
Through his involvement with the Methodist church in the Baltimore area, he became acquainted with fellow minister John Franklin Goucher, who would advocate for Van Meter's appointment to the annual Baltimore Methodist Conference. In the early 1880s, the Baltimore Conference was considering the establishment of a women's college, deliberations in which Van Meter and Goucher became heavily involved.

The women of the conference formed an association through which they pushed for such an institution, and Van Meter supported their efforts, at one point exclaiming that "the Conference [should] make the foundation and endowment of a female college the single object of its organized effort." Goucher and his wife, Mary Fisher Goucher, offered to help endow the institution, and in 1885, the Women's College of Baltimore City, now Goucher College, was chartered.

Dean and acting president of Goucher 
In 1910, the Women's College of Baltimore was renamed to Goucher College, in honor of co-founder John Goucher. In 1911, Goucher's third president, Eugene Allan Noble, stepped down. Van Meter, who was then the dean, was asked by the board of trustees to serve as acting president while they searched for a permanent replacement. Van Meter held the position of acting president from 1911 to 1913, during which time financial difficulties, namely persistent annual deficits and growing debt, threatened the survival of the school. With support from nearby educational institutions and associates and alumni of the college, the college completed a $1-million fundraising campaign, which was enough to sustain it. Van Meter reassumed his position as dean when the administration named William Westley Guth as the college's fourth president. Van Meter also remained on the faculty as a professor of English and biblical studies. Van Meter stepped down from his position as dean at Goucher in 1914, and in 1920 he was awarded an honorary doctorate by the school.

Later years 
Van Meter lived out his final years in Baltimore, Maryland. He died in 1930 and was buried in Green Mount Cemetery.

References 

|-

1842 births
1930 deaths
Goucher College faculty and staff
Presidents of Goucher College
United States Navy Chaplain Corps
19th-century American educators
20th-century American educators
American Quakers
American Methodist clergy
20th-century Methodist ministers
19th-century Methodist ministers
American people of English descent
American people of French descent
Baltimore City College alumni
American biblical scholars
19th-century biblical scholars
American academics of English literature
Methodist biblical scholars
19th-century Christian biblical scholars
20th-century American clergy
19th-century American clergy